Thapsia usambarensis is a species of air-breathing land snail or semi-slug, a terrestrial pulmonate gastropod mollusk in the family Helicarionidae. This species is endemic to Tanzania.

References

Fauna of Tanzania
Thapsia
Taxonomy articles created by Polbot